Estakhr-e Deraz may refer to:
Estakhr-e Deraz, Kerman
Estakhr-e Deraz, South Khorasan